The men's Greco-Roman 130 kg is a competition featured at the 2014 European Wrestling Championships, and was held in Vantaa, Finland on April 3.

Medalists

Results
Legend
F — Won by fall

Main bracket

Repechage

References

External links
Official website

Men's Greco-Roman 130 kg